Ventucopa is an unincorporated community in the southeastern Cuyama Valley, within eastern Santa Barbara County, California.  Ventucopa has a population of 92 people and is located an elevation of 2,896 ft. It is an agricultural area situated near the Cuyama River. It is located near the intersection of four counties: Santa Barbara, Ventura, San Luis Obispo and Kern. Ventucopa borders Los Padres National Forest to the east, south and west. When the town was registering a postal office in 1926, local resident Dean Parady came up with Ventucopa, as the community lies between Maricopa and Ventura County.

The ZIP Code is 93252, and the community is inside area code 661.

Geography
The community is on the southern Maricopa Highway section of State Route 33, near an upper southern fork of the seasonally-dry Cuyama River.

The name Ventucopa is a portmanteau of the cities of Ventura and Maricopa, which are located along Highway 33 to the south and north, respectively.

Access
Because of how the county borders were drawn in relation to the valley and the Cuyama River, the community is ground transportation isolated from the rest of Santa Barbara County. Travel to other communities within the county requires crossing through either Ventura County (south) via the southern Maricopa Highway section of State Route 33 and Ojai to 101, or San Luis Obispo County (north) via the western Cuyama Highway−State Route 166 and Santa Maria to 101.  Access from the San Joaquin Valley and Interstate 5 to the north in Kern County is via the eastern Maricopa Highway section of State Route 166.

See also

References

Unincorporated communities in Santa Barbara County, California
Cuyama Valley
Populated places established in 1952
1952 establishments in California
Unincorporated communities in California